Greensleeves Rhythm Album #32: Threat is an album in Greensleeves Records' rhythm album series.  It was released in November 2002 on CD and LP.  The album features various artists recorded over the "Threat" riddim.  The riddim was built by Steely & Clevie and produced by Troy McLean and Garfield Hamilton for First Name Productions.

Track listing
"Ghetto Girls" - Elephant Man
"Don't Come Around" - Beenie Man
"Doin' It Right" - Sizzla
"Celebrate" - Assassin
"Where I'm From" - T.O.K.
"The Ras" - Spragga Benz
"Gal Out Road" - Lexxus
"Wine Your Waist" - Red Rat
"Girls Night" - Frisco Kid
"With Mi Gal" - Bling Dawg
"Gi Dem The Wine" - Mr. Vegas
"Phone Number" - Danny English & Egg Nog
"Pick a Side" - Kiprich
"Wanna Be" - Alozade
"Shake It" - Kirk Davis
"All Ma Ladies" - Zumjay
"Woman With Shape" - Lukie D
"Dreams & Hopes" - Hawkeye
"Fi Real" - Shaddu
"Quality Time" - Kiprich

2002 compilation albums
Reggae compilation albums